The Pratchett Portfolio is a small collection of the artistic works of Paul Kidby, illustrating the characters of Terry Pratchett's Discworld.  It includes a small blurb on each character, and a picture of said person. In addition to the art, each blurb talks about how Pratchett created the characters. The portfolio was published in 1996 and followed in 2004 by The Art of Discworld.

The portfolio includes entries for characters such as Lady Ramkin, Detritus, Mustrum Ridcully, the Death of Rats, as well as Rincewind running around in the Dungeon Dimensions.

Translations

 Das Scheibenwelt Album (German)

References

External links
 

Discworld books
1996 books
Victor Gollancz Ltd books